Thomas Alvin Janik (September 6, 1940 – November 21, 2009) was an American football player.  Born in Poth, Texas, he attended the Texas College of Arts and Industries—now known as Texas A&M University–Kingsville— where he was an all-conference running back and punter.  He was inducted to the school's Athletic Hall of Fame in 1982. Janik was a safety for nine seasons of professional football.  He played for the American Football League's Denver Broncos, Buffalo Bills, and Boston Patriots, and for the NFL's Patriots.  He was an AFL All-Star in 1965, when he played for the AFL Champion Bills, and again in 1967.  
        
One of Janik's biggest games was the September 29, 1968 contest at home against the New York Jets, in which the Bills' defensive backfield picked off Joe Namath five times, three times for touchdowns as Butch Byrd and Booker Edgerson had 53 and 45-yard TD interceptions within 1:02, and Janik had one of two picks go for a 100-yard score. The Bills won a barn-burner, 37–35, which was Buffalo's only win of the season.  The Jets went on to finish 11–3, and won the AFL title before going on to defeat the Colts in Super Bowl III.

See also
 List of American Football League players

References

1940 births
2009 deaths
American football punters
American football safeties
Boston Patriots players
Buffalo Bills players
Denver Broncos (AFL) players
Texas A&M–Kingsville Javelinas football players
New England Patriots players
American Football League All-Star players
People from Wilson County, Texas
Players of American football from Texas
American Football League players